Pyrgophorus parvulus is a species of gastropods belonging to the family Cochliopidae.

The species is found in Central America.

References

Cochliopidae
Fauna of Central America